SNU may refer to:

Solar neutrino unit in astronomy
Spiritualists' National Union, UK

Universities
Seoul National University, South Korea
Shaanxi Normal University, China
Shenyang Normal University, China
Shiv Nadar University, Greater Noida, India
Somali National University, Mogadishu, Somalia
Southern Nazarene University, Bethany, Oklahoma, USA
Sunchon National University, South Korea

Snu may also be used for:
Sigma Nu, a college fraternity, US and Canada